Utetheisa antennata is a moth in the family Erebidae. It was described by Charles Swinhoe in 1893. It is found on the Nicobar Islands in the Indian Ocean.

References

Moths described in 1893
antennata